Daniel Lyons may refer to:

 Daniel Lyons, an American writer
Daniel Lyons (rower) (born 1958), rower who competed in the 1988 Olympics
 Daniel Lyons (shipwreck), a sunken schooner in Lake Michigan
 Daniel Lyons, co-founder of Factory Green, an eco-friendly clothing and accessories company
 Danny Lyons (1860–1888), a gangster
 Dan Lyons, a CEO of the Centre for Animals and Social Justice in the UK

See also
Daniel Lyon (disambiguation)

Lyons, Daniel